Francisco Javier Fernández Peláez (born 6 March 1977 in Guadix, Province of Granada, Andalusia), better known as Paquillo Fernández, is a retired Spanish race walker. He specialized in the 20 km race walk.

On 27 July 2008 he set a new 10-km race walk world record at the Spanish Championships in a time of 37:53.09.

International competitions

See also
 2002 Race Walking Year Ranking
 List of doping cases in sport
 List of world records in athletics

References

External links
  
 
 
 

1977 births
Living people
Sportspeople from the Province of Granada
Spanish male racewalkers
Olympic athletes of Spain
Olympic silver medalists for Spain
Olympic silver medalists in athletics (track and field)
Athletes (track and field) at the 2000 Summer Olympics
Athletes (track and field) at the 2004 Summer Olympics
Athletes (track and field) at the 2008 Summer Olympics
Medalists at the 2004 Summer Olympics
World Athletics Championships athletes for Spain
World Athletics Championships medalists
European Athletics Championships medalists
World record setters in athletics (track and field)
World record holders in athletics (track and field)
Doping cases in athletics
Spanish sportspeople in doping cases
Mediterranean Games gold medalists for Spain
Mediterranean Games medalists in athletics
Athletes (track and field) at the 2005 Mediterranean Games
World Athletics Race Walking Team Championships winners
People from Guadix